Kristoffer Tabori (also known as K.T. Donaldson, born Christopher Donald Siegel; August 4, 1952) is an American actor and television director.

Early life
Tabori was born in Malibu, California, the son of American film director Don Siegel and Swedish-American actress Viveca Lindfors. He appeared in one of his mother's films, Weddings and Babies, as a young boy. In 1995, they appeared together in Last Summer in the Hamptons. His parents divorced in 1953 and Lindfors married Hungarian writer and director George Tabori. Kristoffer adopted his stepfather's surname and changed the English spelling of his forename.

Career

He started his career as a stage actor in his teens in the late 1960s, and during the 1970s he appeared in many films, including John and Mary (1969), Pigeons (1971), Making It (1971), Journey Through Rosebud (1972) and Girlfriends (1978). The majority of his work, however, was in television drama, beginning with a notable role (Bert) in the TV film of Arthur Miller's A Memory of Two Mondays (1971).  During the latter two decades, Tabori appeared in dozens of guest roles in many of the medium's most popular network shows, including Owen Marshall: Counselor at Law; Cannon; Marcus Welby, M.D.; The Streets of San Francisco; The Rockford Files; Barnaby Jones; Murder She Wrote; Tour of Duty; and TV miniseries including QB VII, Seventh Avenue, Brave New World and Strong Medicine.

In 1988, he also played the part of Sir Henry Baskerville in a television production of The Hound of the Baskervilles next to Jeremy Brett as Sherlock Holmes and Edward Hardwicke as Dr. Watson. During the 1990s, Tabori began directing in television and has over forty shows, mostly episode dramas, to his credit. In 2007, Tabori directed the TV film Anna's Storm and episodes of Falcon Beach. In 2008, he directed episodes of The Guard and jPod. He directed the SyFy Channel aliens-Western film High Plains Invaders.

Tabori also has established a career in voice-only work. In 1989, he played Prof. Peter Plum in the first television series of Cluedo, where he was known for his loud protestations of innocence during the studio-based portions of the program.
He also voiced HK-47, the assassin droid and comic relief character in the videogames Star Wars: Knights of the Old Republic and Star Wars: Knights of the Old Republic II: The Sith Lords. Tabori voices HK-47, HK-51, and HK-55 again in the 2010 MMORPG Star Wars: The Old Republic, as well as providing the voices for some characters in other Star Wars related products and in the Battlestar Galactica area.

Tabori was also featured on the radio program CBS Radio Mystery Theatre. On television, Tabori supplied the voice of War Minister and Emissary in Avatar: The Last Airbender and voiced several characters in The Adventures of Don Coyote and Sancho Panda as well as the home video series The Greatest Adventure: Stories from the Bible. In 2012, he also voiced the main villain character the Lord Regent Hiram Burrows in a popular stealth action adventure video game Dishonored.

He is an Audie Award-winning audiobook narrator and has performed in audio plays for Yuri Rasovsky, as well as performing the audiobook narration for Jeffrey Eugenides' Pulitzer prize winning novel Middlesex.

Tabori is the voice of the narrator, Miles, in the 1976 audiobook "Invasion of the Body Snatchers" by Jack Finney. His father, Donald Siegel, had directed the 1956 film version of the novel. In 2008, he voiced a major villain, The Vulture, in Spider-Man: Web of Shadows.

Filmography

Film

Television

Video games

References

External links
 

1952 births
Living people
20th-century American male actors
21st-century American male actors
Male actors from California
American male film actors
American people of Swedish descent
American male stage actors
American male television actors
American television directors
American male voice actors
Jewish American male actors
People from Greater Los Angeles
Male actors from Malibu, California
Film directors from California
21st-century American Jews